Crawl is the eleventh studio album by Japanese Pop band Deen. It was released on 9 August 2010 under music label Ariola Japan.

Background
The album consists of only one previously released single, coconuts feat. kokomo.

Several songs such asHitomi Sorasanaide received new version and instrumentation under title 2009+Ukulele Style; Gekkou no Nagisa and Blue eyes had received new rearrangement from the original version as well. Two tracks out of twelve are instrumental.

The band covered Anzen Chitai's 12th single Natsu no Owari no Harmony.

This album was released in two formats: regular CD edition and limited CD+DVD edition. The limited edition Natsu Best ~Deen Summer Time Melodies~ includes CD of the selected tracks with the new arrangement, including their biggest hits such as Tsubasa wo Hirogete and Kimi ga Inai Natsu, which would fit the concept of this album - summer.

Charting performance
The album reached #23 in its first week and charted for 3 weeks, selling 7,297 copies.

Track listing

In media
Jidousha Race - commercial song for The Kagoshima Bank

References

Sony Music albums
Japanese-language albums
2010 albums
Deen (band) albums